Tetsuzo Kojima  (29 September 1909–1988) was a Japanese jurist who served as the minister of justice briefly between July and December 1960.

Biography
He was born on 29 September 1909 in Hyogo prefecture. He was a graduate of Tokyo Imperial University where he received a bachelor's degree in law. He was a member of the Liberal Democratic Party and served in the executive committee of the party heading its judicial affairs committee. He was appointed minister of justice on 19 July 1960 to the cabinet led by Prime Minister Hayato Ikeda and served in the post until 8 December 1960.

References

External links

20th-century Japanese politicians
20th-century jurists
1909 births
1988 deaths
Japanese jurists
Liberal Democratic Party (Japan) politicians
Members of the House of Representatives (Japan)
Ministers of Justice of Japan
Politicians from Hyōgo Prefecture
University of Tokyo alumni